Lockwood Gardens, is a neighborhood and housing project located in East Oakland, California, on 65th and International Boulevard. The neighborhood lies at an elevation of 25 feet (6 m) and is located less than a mile from the Oakland Coliseum.

Lockwood is also known as the "6-5 Vill" (Village), and is one half of the "Vill." The other half of the "Vill" is the recently torn down 69th San Antonio Villas housing project, where infamous drug kingpin Felix Mitchell is from. The 69th San Antonio Villas have since been remodeled and is now a mixed-income community. The Oakland Housing Authority also remodeled Lockwood Gardens.

References

External links
Lockwood Gardens

Neighborhoods in Oakland, California
Buildings and structures in Oakland, California
Public housing in Oakland, California